HMS Pearl was a 20-gun British Royal Navy sloop. Lord Clarence Paget, then a Commander, was given command of Pearl on 17 January 1837. On 18 April 1838 she captured the Portuguese slave brig Diligente. On 28 April, off the coast of Havana, she captured the Spanish slave schooner Opposicao. She also captured the slave ship Vengador.

References

1828 ships
Sloops of the United Kingdom